George W. Hartman was an American football coach.  He served as the captain of Franklin & Marshall College in Lancaster, Pennsylvania, during a period of time when the captain also served as the team's head coach. He held that position for the 1894 season. Franklin & Marshall had a 6–4 record during his tenure.

Head coaching record

References

Year of birth missing
Year of death missing
Franklin & Marshall Diplomats football coaches